Cedar Grove Plantation Chapel, also known as Summer Chapel, All Saints' Episcopal Church, and Waccamaw, is a historic plantation chapel located near Pawleys Island, Georgetown County, South Carolina. It was built about 1850, and is a small, frame vernacular Gothic Revival style chapel.  It features a pedimented portico supported by four, paneled, square columns. The chapel is associated with All Saints’ Episcopal Church.

It was listed on the National Register of Historic Places in 1991.

References

Former Episcopal church buildings in South Carolina
Churches on the National Register of Historic Places in South Carolina
Churches completed in 1850
Carpenter Gothic church buildings in South Carolina
National Register of Historic Places in Georgetown County, South Carolina
Churches in Georgetown County, South Carolina
19th-century Episcopal church buildings
1850 establishments in South Carolina